Juminda peninsula is peninsula in Harju County, Estonia.

Peninsula is bordered by Hara Bay (on right) and Kolga Bay (on left).

The length of peninsula is about 13 km and width (in south) about 6 km.

"Majakivi", the third biggest boulder in Estonia, is located on Juminda peninsula.

References

Peninsulas of Estonia
Kuusalu Parish